The sachnisi (Greek: σαχνισί, from the Turkish word şahniş) is a traditional type of bay window found in Northern Greece, the Balkans and the Middle East.

References
Papyrus Larousse Britannica, 2006

Windows